This is a list of administrators and governors of Taraba State, Nigeria. Taraba State was created out of the former Gongola State on 27 August 1991 by the military government of General Ibrahim Babangida.

See also
States of Nigeria
List of state governors of Nigeria

References

External links

Taraba